In the East Asian writing system, gothic typefaces (godik-che) are a type style characterized by strokes of even thickness and lack of decorations akin to sans serif styles in Western typography. It is the second most commonly used style in East Asian typography, after Ming.

History 

Gothic typefaces were first developed in Japan. Starting in the 1960s, the People's Republic of China's Shanghai Printing Technology and Research Institute developed new typefaces for Simplified Chinese, including gothic typefaces. The communist government favored gothic typefaces because they were plain and "represented a break with the past."

Characteristics 
Similar to Ming and Song typefaces, sans-serif typefaces were designed for printing, but they were also designed for legibility. They are commonly used in headlines, signs, and video applications.

Classifications 

 Square sans (Japanese:  kaku goshikku), the classic sans-serif style in which the lines of the characters have squared ends.
 Overlapping square sans - This style is similar to the square sans, but in places where strokes overlap, a margin is inserted between the strokes to distinguish the strokes.
 Square new book - Uses narrow horizontal and thick vertical strokes, similar to typefaces such as Optima.
 Round sans (Japanese:  maru goshikku, Korean: gullimche), has rounded ends and corners to the lines of the characters. In some cases, short protruding stroke ends at intersections are eliminated to make glyphs look rounder. This is the style of typeface used for Japanese road signs.
 Overlapping round sans - This is similar to the round sans, but in places where strokes overlap, a margin is inserted between the strokes to distinguish the strokes.
 Rounded new book - Uses narrow horizontal and thick vertical strokes, along with rounded line ends and corners.
 Mixed art - Curved strokes are replaced by angled strokes with sharp or round corners.

Sans-serif typefaces in computing 

Sans serif typefaces, especially for default system fonts, are common in Japanese computing.  Also, many Korean computing environments use Gulim which includes soft curves but is a sans-serif typeface.

In Chinese, versions of Microsoft Windows XP and older, the default interface typefaces have serifs (MingLiU and SimSun), which deviates from the sans serif styling use in most other (including East Asian) regions of the product. Starting in Windows Vista, the default interface typefaces in all regions were changed to sans-serif styles, using Microsoft JhengHei in Traditional Chinese environments and Microsoft YaHei in Simplified Chinese environments.

See also 
 East Asian typography
 Ming (typeface)

References

External links 
 Nihongo resources: Japanese typefaces
 sci.lang.japan FAQ list of Japanese writing styles
 Sorting It All Out : The big font list in Windows
 Sorting It All Out : What are the fonts in Vista?

Chinese type styles
CJK typefaces